Selishchi is the name of several  rural localities in Russia.

Ivanovo Oblast
As of 2022, two rural localities in Ivanovo Oblast bear this name:
Selishchi, Lukhsky District, Ivanovo Oblast, a village in Lukhsky District
Selishchi, Yuzhsky District, Ivanovo Oblast, a village in Yuzhsky District

Republic of Mordovia
As of 2022, three rural localities in the Republic of Mordovia bear this name:
Selishchi, Atyashevsky District, Republic of Mordovia, a selo in Selishchinsky Selsoviet of Atyashevsky District
Selishchi, Ichalkovsky District, Republic of Mordovia, a selo in Beregovo-Syresevsky Selsoviet of Ichalkovsky District
Selishchi, Krasnoslobodsky District, Republic of Mordovia, a selo in Selishchinsky Selsoviet of Krasnoslobodsky District

Nizhny Novgorod Oblast
As of 2022, three rural localities in Nizhny Novgorod Oblast bear this name:
Selishchi, Krasnoslobodsky Selsoviet, Bor, Nizhny Novgorod Oblast, a village in Krasnoslobodsky Selsoviet of the town of oblast significance of Bor
Selishchi, Yamnovsky Selsoviet, Bor, Nizhny Novgorod Oblast, a selo in Yamnovsky Selsoviet of the town of oblast significance of Bor
Selishchi, Perevozsky District, Nizhny Novgorod Oblast, a village in Tsentralny Selsoviet of Perevozsky District

Novgorod Oblast
As of 2022, three rural localities in Novgorod Oblast bear this name:
Selishchi, Chudovsky District, Novgorod Oblast, a village in Tregubovskoye Settlement of Chudovsky District
Selishchi, Malovishersky District, Novgorod Oblast, a village under the administrative jurisdiction of the town of district significance of Malaya Vishera, Malovishersky District
Selishchi, Soletsky District, Novgorod Oblast, a village in Dubrovskoye Settlement of Soletsky District

Pskov Oblast
As of 2022, one rural locality in Pskov Oblast bears this name:
Selishchi, Pskov Oblast, a village in Sebezhsky District

Ryazan Oblast
As of 2022, one rural locality in Ryazan Oblast bears this name:
Selishchi, Ryazan Oblast, a selo in Akhmatovsky Rural Okrug of Kasimovsky District

Tver Oblast
As of 2022, five rural localities in Tver Oblast bear this name:
Selishchi (Semendyayevskoye Rural Settlement), Kalyazinsky District, Tver Oblast, a village in Kalyazinsky District; municipally, a part of Semendyayevskoye Rural Settlement of that district
Selishchi (Nerlskoye Rural Settlement), Kalyazinsky District, Tver Oblast, name of two villages in Kalyazinsky District; municipally, a part of Nerlskoye Rural Settlement of that district
Selishchi, Kimrsky District, Tver Oblast, a village in Kimrsky District
Selishchi, Maksatikhinsky District, Tver Oblast, a village in Maksatikhinsky District

Vladimir Oblast
As of 2022, one rural locality in Vladimir Oblast bears this name:
Selishchi, Vladimir Oblast, a village in Selivanovsky District

Yaroslavl Oblast
As of 2022, one rural locality in Yaroslavl Oblast bears this name:
Selishchi, Yaroslavl Oblast, a village in Stoginsky Rural Okrug of Gavrilov-Yamsky District